Philby can refer to the following people

 St John Philby a British intelligence officer and explorer
 His son Kim Philby, a KGB  mole  double agent inside  the United Kingdom's MI6
 Philby (The Kingdom Keepers) a character in The Kingdom Keepers

See also
 Filby, a surname